Anthony John Hrkac (born July 7, 1966) is a Canadian former professional ice hockey player of Croatian and Ukrainian ancestry who played eighteen seasons of professional hockey.

Playing career

Collegiate
Hrkac was drafted in the second round, 32nd overall, by the St. Louis Blues in the 1984 NHL Entry Draft. Hrkac played collegiately at the University of North Dakota, and was the recipient of the Hobey Baker Award for top men's collegiate hockey player during the 1986–87 season.  He led the team (along with future Chicago Blackhawks teammate and Hockey Hall of Fame inductee Ed Belfour) —widely known during this period as the "Hrkac Circus" (the name rhymes)   — to a national championship and his 116 points that season still stands as the NCAA single-season scoring mark.

Professional
He made his National Hockey League debut with the Blues during the 1987 NHL playoffs, appearing in three games.  After two-plus seasons with the Blues, he was traded (along with Greg Millen) to the Quebec Nordiques in exchange for Jeff Brown.

In his NHL career, Hrkac would play for the Blues, Nordiques, San Jose Sharks, Chicago Blackhawks, Dallas Stars, Edmonton Oilers, New York Islanders, Mighty Ducks of Anaheim, and Atlanta Thrashers. Hrkac's rights were also briefly owned by the Pittsburgh Penguins when they acquired him and Bobby Dollas from the Edmonton Oilers for forward Josef Beranek. On June 26, ten days after initially acquiring Hrkac, the Penguins lost Hrkac to the Nashville Predators in the 1998 NHL Expansion Draft. Less than two weeks later, Hrkac was moved; this time to the Dallas Stars. He was traded on July 9, 1998, for future considerations.

In 758 career NHL games, Hrkac scored 132 goals and added 239 assists. He also appeared in 41 playoff games, scoring seven goals and adding seven assists. Four of those seven goals came in one game against the Chicago Blackhawks on April 10, 1988, setting a St. Louis Blues record for most goals scored in a playoff game by one player. Hrkac was a member of the 1998–99 Dallas Stars team which won the Stanley Cup.

Hrkac returned to the minor leagues in 2003 after he was unable to sign with an NHL club.  He was a key player on the Calder Cup champion Milwaukee Admirals in 2003–04.  While there were rumors that the St. Louis Blues were seeking to sign him for one last stint with his original team, Hrkac retired after the 2004–05 season.

On March 14, 2008, Hrkac's number 26 jersey was retired by the AHL's Milwaukee Admirals, through his two tenures with the club between 1994 and 2005.

Hrkac came out of retirement for the 2008–09 season, at the age of 42, by signing with the AHL's Houston Aeros on March 11, 2009.

Coaching career
On September 19, 2006, Concordia University Wisconsin officials announced that the university added Division III men's and women's hockey to its sports line-up for the 2007–2008 school year. Hrkac was named the first men's hockey coach in Concordia history serving as coach until February 2012, with a coaching record of 10-109-10 while at Concordia.

Career statistics

Awards and honors

References

External links
 
  Official website

1966 births
Living people
Atlanta Thrashers players
Canadian ice hockey centres
Canadian ice hockey coaches
Canadian people of Croatian descent
Canadian people of Ukrainian descent
Chicago Blackhawks players
Dallas Stars players
Edmonton Oilers players
Halifax Citadels players
Hobey Baker Award winners
Houston Aeros (1994–2013) players
Ice hockey people from Ontario
Sportspeople from Thunder Bay
Indianapolis Ice players
Kalamazoo Wings (1974–2000) players
Mighty Ducks of Anaheim players
Milwaukee Admirals players
Milwaukee Admirals (IHL) players
New York Islanders players
Peoria Rivermen (IHL) players
Quebec Nordiques players
St. Louis Blues draft picks
St. Louis Blues players
San Jose Sharks players
Stanley Cup champions
North Dakota Fighting Hawks men's ice hockey players
NCAA men's ice hockey national champions
AHCA Division I men's ice hockey All-Americans